Rukovan (also Romanized as Rūkovān) is a village in Gurani Rural District, Gahvareh District, Dalahu County, Kermanshah Province, Iran. At the 2006 census, its population was 43, in 9 families.

References 

Populated places in Dalahu County